The 1950 Arkansas State Indians football team represented Arkansas State College—now known as Arkansas State University—as a member of the Arkansas Intercollegiate Conference (AIC) during the 1950 college football season. Led by fifth-year head coach Forrest England, the Indians compiled an overall record of 6–3.

Schedule

References

Arkansas State
Arkansas State Red Wolves football seasons
Arkansas State Indians football